Emanuel Hirsch Cohen (June 1, 1915 – February 24, 2004), better known by the stage name John Randolph, was an American film, television and stage actor.

Early life
Randolph was born Emanuel Hirsch Cohen in New York City on June 1, 1915, the son of Jewish immigrants from Russia and Romania. His mother, Dorothy (née Shorr), was an insurance agent, and his father, Louis Cohen, was a hat manufacturer. In the 1930s, he spent his summers at the Pine Brook Country Club in Nichols, Connecticut which was the summer home of the Group Theatre. He made his Broadway debut in 1938 in Coriolanus. Randolph joined the United States Army Air Forces in World War II. He had a small role in the 1948 film The Naked City.

He and wife Sarah Cunningham were blacklisted from working in Hollywood films and in New York film and television and radio after 1948. In 1955 they were both called before the House Un-American Activities Committee to testify concerning ongoing investigations regarding Communist infiltration in the American entertainment industry. Both he and his wife refused to answer questions and cited the Fifth Amendment protection against testifying against themselves.

John and Sarah Randolph were very active in AFTRA, SAG and in Actor's Equity, were elected members of union boards and became vice presidents at various times during their careers. 

From 1988 to 1991 he served as chairman of the National Council of American–Soviet Friendship.

Career
Randolph was one of the last blacklisted actors to regain employment in Hollywood films when director John Frankenheimer cast him in a major role in Seconds in 1966. Randolph was in the original New York stage productions of The Sound of Music (as Von Trapp's butler, Franz), Paint Your Wagon, and The Visit.

He won the 1987 Tony Award for Best Performance by a Featured Actor in a Play for his performance in the Neil Simon play Broadway Bound. He made his last Broadway appearance in 1991 in Prelude to a Kiss.

Randolph made numerous screen and television appearances in secondary roles. He played Chief Sidney Green in Serpico (1973), directed by Sidney Lumet. He also played the father of Charlie Partana (played by Jack Nicholson) in Prizzi's Honor and Clark W. Griswold, Sr. in National Lampoon's Christmas Vacation (with Chevy Chase). From 1973 to 1976, he made three appearances as Cornelius "Junior" Harrison, Jr., father of Emily Hartley, in The Bob Newhart Show, (shows #37, #59, and #106).

In 1974, he played an Air Force Colonel in the Columbo episode "Swan Song". He played a mayor in Earthquake (1974), a disaster film. In 1975, Randolph was cast as General Philip Blankenship in The New Original Wonder Woman pilot. He was replaced by Richard Eastham in the television series. He had an uncredited role in the 1976 film All The President's Men as the voice of Richard Nixon's Attorney General John Mitchell.

He played Judge J. Waties Waring in "With All Deliberate Speed", a 1976 episode of CBS's mini-series: The American Parade, dealing with events culminating in the 1954 Supreme Court decision (Brown v Board of Education) barring racial segregation in US public schools.  In 1977, Randolph appeared in a made-for-TV movie entitled The Gathering, a Christmas-themed show along with Edward Asner and Maureen Stapleton. The movie won the Emmy for Outstanding Special - Drama or Comedy. 

In 1979, he had a guest appearance on M*A*S*H as an adjutant army general admiring the culinary prowess of a master chef errantly assigned as a foot soldier in a front unit.  From 1979 to 1980, he played Donna Pescow's father in-law on the television series Angie.

In 1982, he appeared in a first-season episode of Family Ties as Jake Keaton, Steven Keaton's father. He was a special guest star in the 1986 ABC made-for-TV movie The Right of the People, playing Police Chief Hollander in a town soon allowing all adults to carry handguns. 

In 1988, he appeared in a Season 2 episode of Matlock as the head of a crime family in "The Investigation". In 1989 he appeared in two episodes of Roseanne playing Al, Roseanne's dad, who was later revealed to be an abusive parent.  In 1991 he guested in an episode of Married ... With Children entitled "Al Bundy, Shoe Dick".

In 1990, he landed a regular series role, co-starring as a family patriarch in the NBC comedy Grand, co-starring Bonnie Hunt, and Michael McKean. The series only lasted two seasons, despite a timeslot following NBC's highly successful Cheers.

He co-starred with Alec Guinness, Leo McKern, Jeanne Moreau and Lauren Bacall, in the BBC production of A Foreign Field (1993) as a World War II veteran returning to France to find the woman he fell in love with.

He appeared as Frank Costanza, George Costanza's father, in "The Handicap Spot", an early episode of the television sitcom Seinfeld, which reunited him with his Broadway Bound co-star Jason Alexander. He was later replaced in that role by Jerry Stiller, and, in 1995, the scenes in which Randolph appeared were re-shot with Stiller, though Randolph continued to be credited in some airings. The re-shot version is shown in syndication in the United States (but can also be seen on the DVD). The original version, with Randolph, can be seen outside the U.S. and on DVD, Hulu and Crackle. 

One of his last film roles was as Joe Fox's grandfather in You've Got Mail (1998).

On February 24, 2004, Randolph died at his home in Hollywood, California, of natural causes, aged eighty-eight.  He acted up until the year before his death.

Selected filmography
 The Naked City (1948) - Police Dispatcher (uncredited)
 Fourteen Hours (1951) - Fireman (uncredited)
 Hamlet (1964) - Gravedigger
 The Patty Duke Show (1965) - Coach
 Seconds (1966) - Arthur Hamilton
 Sweet Love, Bitter (1967)
 The Borgia Stick (1967) - Smith
 Pretty Poison (1968) - Morton Azenauer
 Hawaii Five-O (1969) - Marty Sloane
 Smith! (1969) - Mr. Edwards
 Number One (1969) - Coach Southerd
 Gaily, Gaily (1969) - Father
 There Was a Crooked Man... (1970) - Cyrus McNutt
 Little Murders (1971) - Mr. Chamberlain
 Escape from the Planet of the Apes (1971) - Chairman
 A Death of Innocence (1971)
 Conquest of the Planet of the Apes (1972) - Commission Chairman
 Serpico (1973) - Sidney Green
 Earthquake (1974) - Mayor
 Everybody Rides the Carousel (1975) - Stage 7 (voice)
 All The President's Men (1976) - John Mitchell (voice, uncredited)
 King Kong (1976) - Captain Ross
 The Gathering (1977) - Dr. Hodges
 Heaven Can Wait (1978) - Former Owner
 Lovely But Deadly (1981) - Franklin Van Dyke
 The Adventures of Nellie Bly (1981) - Joseph Pulitzer
 Frances (1982) - Kindly Judge
 Prizzi's Honor (1985) - Angelo 'Pop' Partanna
 Means and Ends (1985) - Bill Henderson
 The Wizard of Loneliness (1988) - Doc
 National Lampoon's Christmas Vacation (1989) - Clark Griswold, Sr.
 Sibling Rivalry (1990) - Charles Turner Sr.
 Iron Maze (1991) - Mayor Peluso
 The Hotel Manor Inn (1997) - Gus
 Here Dies Another Day (1997) - Brace
 A Price Above Rubies (1998) - Rebbe Moshe
 You've Got Mail (1998) - Schuyler Fox
 The Dogwalker (1999) - Ike
 Sunset Strip (2000) - Mr. Niederhaus
 Numb (2003) - (final film role)

References

External links

 
 
 In Remembrance: John Randolph
 John Randolph papers, 1921-1998 (bulk 1940-1975), held by the Billy Rose Theatre Division, New York Public Library for the Performing Arts
 John Randolph(Aveleyman)

1915 births
2004 deaths
American male film actors
American people of Russian-Jewish descent
American people of Romanian-Jewish descent
United States Army Air Forces personnel of World War II
American male stage actors
American male television actors
Hollywood blacklist
Jewish American male actors
Male actors from New York City
20th-century American male actors
21st-century American male actors
California Democrats
New York (state) Democrats
20th-century American Jews
21st-century American Jews